Benjamin Noirot (born 17 December 1980 in Dijon) is a professional rugby union hooker currently playing for RC Toulonnais in the Top 14. He has previously played for US Dax and Biarritz Olympique. He made his international debut for France against Fiji in November 2010.

References

External links
Statistics from It's Rugby
Racing Métro 92 profile

France international rugby union players
French rugby union players
Racing 92 players
Biarritz Olympique players
RC Toulonnais players
1980 births
Sportspeople from Dijon
Living people
Rugby union hookers